Dolichoderus inferus is a species of ant in the genus Dolichoderus. Described by Shattuck and Marsden in 2013, the species is endemic to Australia, where it inhabits both wet and dry sclerophyll habitats and forages on low vegetation and trees.

References

Dolichoderus
Hymenoptera of Australia
Insects described in 2013
Endemic fauna of Australia